"Amazing" is a song recorded by British singer Seal. It was produced by Stuart Price and released as the lead single from his fifth studio album System (2007). Although not a big success on the Billboard Hot 100, it did reach number-one on the Billboard Hot Dance Club Play chart. The single was released on iTunes on 25 September 2007 in the United States. The song served as the theme song for the third cycle of Germany's Next Topmodel and has been used in advertisements for the CBS reality show, The Amazing Race 12. Along with other songs from the album, "Amazing" was also used on the NBC Sunday Night Football, playing right before commercial breaks. Seal performed the song at the annual Victoria's Secret Fashion Show 2007.

Both the original version of the song and the Thin White Duke Edit appeared on the album.

The track was nominated for a Grammy Award on the category of Best Male Pop Vocal Performance.

Remixes
 Kaskade Radio - 3:12
 Kaskade Remix - 6:33
 Kaskade Dub - 6:33
 Bill Hamel Radio - 5:02
 Bill Hamel Vocal Mix - 9:07
 Bill Hamel Dub - 8:39
 Bill Hamel Stripped Mix - 8:39
 Thin White Duke Dub - 6:53
 Thin White Duke Main - 6:55
 Thin White Duke Edit - 3:27

Chart performance

Weekly charts

Year-end charts

See also
List of number-one dance singles of 2007 (U.S.)
List of number-one dance airplay hits of 2007 (U.S.)

References

2007 singles
Seal (musician) songs
Songs written by Seal (musician)
Song recordings produced by Stuart Price
2007 songs
Warner Music Group singles